This chronology outlines the major events in the history of the Book of Mormon, according to the text. Dates given correspond to dates in the footnotes of the Church of Jesus Christ of Latter-day Saints (LDS Church) edition of the Book of Mormon.

Jaredites
Totaling 2,530 years

Pioneering Phase (3100-2920 B.C.) Years
180 years  
 Departure from Tower of Babel to arrive at land 30  
 Adjustment to choosing a king 70  
 Orihah's rule ("exceeding many days," 31 children) 80

Formation Phase (2920-2320 B.C.)
600 years

Early Formation 
 (Sub-phase--300 years)

 Kib begets Corihor after he becomes king, then reigns 32 years until Corihor's flight 34  
 Corihor prepares to rebel, fathers children who help 32
 Corihor rules, with father captive, until latter is very old 25
 Kib, the father, begets Shule, who grows to manhood before seizing the throne 25§
 Corihor has children, including Noah who rebels and reigns over half the kingdom 33
 Cohor, Noah's son, succeeds him, ruling half the land 15
 Nimrod, another son of Cohor succeeds, then gives up the half kingdom to Shule, reuniting the nation 10
 Thereafter Shule begets children in his old age 25
 Omer, Shule's son, begets Jared, then the latter has children 30
 Jared plots, Omer flees, Jared rules one year 1  
 Akish kills Jared. Akish's one son is imprisoned; he then has others 35  
 Akish wars with his sons for many years 35

B. Late Formation 
 (Sub-phase--300 years)  
 Omer regains the throne. While old, begets Emer, who comes to reign 20  
 Emer's "house" reigns 62 years 62  
 Coriantum follows and rules until 142 years of age 142  
 Com reigns 49 years until Heth is born; Heth grows up then kills his father 30  
 Heth rules until the drought becomes unbearable 24

Disruption Phase (2320-1720 B.C.)
 600 years

Early Disruption 
 (Sub-phase--360 years)
 Interval 30  
 Shez picks up the pieces after drought, and lives long 88  
 Interval 100  
 Riplakish, a son of Shez, gains power, then reigns 42 years, until killed in a rebellion 42  
 Interval 100

Late Disruption 
 (Sub-phase--240 years)
 Morianton, a descendant of Riplakish, prepares, fights for years to gain central power 40  
 He lives to "an exceeding great age" 60  
 His son Kim succeeds him, reigning's years while his father still lives 8  
 Kim's brother later overthrows him; Kim goes into captivity 15  
 Kim begets Levi in his old age 65  
 Levi lives in captivity 42 years after father's death 42  
 Then Levi fights and gains the throne 10

Elaboration Phase (1720-1120 B.C.)
 600 years

Early Elaboration 
 (Sub-phase--270 years)
 Levi rules to "a good old age" 60  
 Corom replaces Levi and "saw many days" 66  
 Kish then reigns and passes away 60  
 Lib next reigns, living many years 60  
 Hearthom rules for 24 Years before being overthrown 24

Late Elaboration 
 (Sub-phase--330 years)
 Hearthom then lives in captivity many years 60  
 Heth also lives in captivity all his days 60  
 Interval 30  
 Aaron (a "descendant") lives in captivity 60  
 Amnigaddah also lives in captivity 60  
 Corianton also was in captivity all his days 60

Decline Phase (1120-570 B.C.)
550 years

Early Decline 
 (Sub-phase--270 years)
 Com matures, prepares, and gains control of half of the kingdom 30  
 He then rules for 42 years (10:32) 42  
 After that he wars "for many years" with Amgid 30  
 After Amgid's demise, Com rules to the accession of his son Shiblom 18  
 Shiblom rules through much trouble, then is slain 35  
 Seth (apparently the successor) in captivity all his days 60  
 His son Ahah retakes the kingdom; "few were his days" 25  
 Interval 30

Late Decline 
 (Sub-phase--280 years)
 Ethem (a "descendant") obtains the kingdom, reigns 50  
 Moroni, his son reigns (10), loses half the kingdom (35), fights but loses all (5), then is a captive (20) 70  
 Coriantor in captivity all his days 60  
 Interval 40  
 Ether (a "descendant") sees the end of the nation 60

Jerusalem and environs

600 BC, Jerusalem
 First Nephi begins.
 First year of the reign of Zedekiah.
 Lehi prophesies to the Jews that they must repent and return to the ways of God; they seek his life.
 Lehi and his family leave Jerusalem and travel in the wilderness near the Red Sea. After three days they arrive in the valley of Lemuel.

Between 600 and 592 BC, In the wilderness
 Lehi sends Laman, Lemuel, Sam and Nephi back to Jerusalem for the brass plates.
 Laman seeks the brass plates from Laban. Laban says he will slay Laman, who flees.
 The brothers go the land of their inheritance and gather their gold, silver and precious things. They offer to buy the brass plates and are driven out by Laban, who keeps their treasure.
 Laman and Lemuel smite Sam and Nephi with a rod. An angel appears and tells them to return to Jerusalem.
 Nephi returns to Jerusalem and finds Laban "fallen to the earth". An angel commands Nephi to slay Laban and puts on his armor. Nephi commands Zoram to get the brass plates.
 Nephi and his brothers take the brass plates to Lehi; Zoram agrees to accompany them.
 Lehi comforts Sariah, who had feared for her sons.
 Lehi sends Laman, Lemuel, Sam and Nephi back to Jerusalem to persuade Ishmael and his family to join them.
 The sons of Lehi and the family of Ishmael leave Jerusalem. Laman and Lemuel and some of Ishmael's children rebel. Nephi persuades them to continue and they rejoin Lehi and Sariah.
 They gather seeds and grain.
 Lehi has a vision of the tree of life.
 Nephi also has a vision of the tree of life, and foresees many future events.
 Nephi's brothers complain that they can't understand the words of their father. Nephi expounds.
 The sons of Lehi and Zoram take the daughters of Ishmael to wife.
 Lehi discovers the Liahona.
 They depart the valley of Lemuel and travel south-southeast for four days. They pitch their tents and call the place Shazer.
 They continue their journey, following the directions of the Liahona.
 Nephi breaks his bow.
 They travel for many days, "traveling nearly the same course as in the beginning".
 Ishmael dies and is buried in the place called Nahom.
 Laman and Lemuel and the sons of Ishmael want to slay Lehi and Nephi. Nephi chastens them and they repent.

592 BC, Bountiful
 They arrive at the land Bountiful, near a sea they call Irreantum.

About 591 BC, Bountiful
 Jacob and Joseph, "born in the wilderness", are first mentioned.
 Nephi is commanded to build a boat. His brothers murmur and complain, but he persuades them to assist and the boat is completed.
 Lehi and his family, Ishmael's family and Zoram embark for the promised land.

About 590 BC, on the sea
 Nephi's brothers and the sons of Ishmael "make themselves merry", "with much rudeness". Nephi fears they will offend God and speaks to them "with much soberness". Laman and Lemuel bind Nephi. Storms arise, their compass ceases to work and they are "driven back upon the waters for the space of three days." On the fourth day, Nephi's brethren see that "the judgements of God were upon them" and they release Nephi.
 Nephi guides the ship "towards the promised land".
 After many days they arrive at the promised land.

The land of Nephi

About 589 BC, in the promised land
 They find "beasts in the forest", "all manner of wild animals" and "ore, both of gold, and of silver, and of copper".

Between 588 and 570 BC, the land of their first inheritance
 Second Nephi begins.
 Lehi blesses his sons.
 Lehi dies and is buried.
 Laman and Lemuel rebel against Nephi. The Lord warns Nephi to flee.

Between 588 and 570 BC, the land of Nephi
 Nephi, Zoram, Sam and their families, Jacob, Joseph, Nephi's sisters and "all who would go with [him]", journey in the wilderness "for the space of many days".
 Nephi and his followers pitch their tents and call the place Nephi.
 Nephi makes swords for his people "lest by any means the people who were now called Lamanites should come upon us and destroy us".
 The Nephites build buildings. Nephi builds a temple.
 The Nephites want Nephi to be their king, but Nephi is "desirous that they should have no king".
 Nephi consecrates Jacob and Joseph as priests.
 The Nephites live "after the manner of happiness".

569 BC, the land of Nephi
 The secular history is kept on metal plates. Nephi makes a second set of plates to record "the things of God".

559 BC, the land of Nephi
 The Nephites "had already had wars and contentions with our brethren".

Between 559 and 545 BC, the land of Nephi
 Jacob and Nephi speak to the people. Nephi rehearses the words of Isaiah.
 Nephi expounds "the doctrine of Christ".
 Nephi bids his "beloved brethren...Farewell until that great day shall come".

544 BC, the land of Nephi
 Jacob receives the small plates. The Book of Jacob begins.

Between 544 and 421 BC, the land of Nephi
 Nephi grows old and appoints a man to be king and ruler. The Nephite rulers are called "second Nephi, third Nephi, and so forth".
 Nephi dies.
 The Nephites begin "to grow hard in their hearts, and indulge themselves somewhat in wicked practices."
 Jacob and Joseph preach to the people.
 "After some years" a man named Sherem preaches "that there should be no Christ". He contends with Jacob and demands a sign. Sherem is smitten by God, recants and dies.
 Probably about 510 B.C. Jacob gives the small plates to his son, Enos, and bids adieu.
 The Book of Enos begins.
 The Nephites try to "restore the Lamanites unto the true faith in God". The Lamanites are "wild" and "ferocious" and feed upon beasts. The Nephites raise grain and fruit and flocks.
 Many prophets are among the Nephites, who need constant reminders to remain faithful.
 There are "wars between the Nephites and the Lamanites".

420 BC, the land of Nephi
 Enos grows old.

Between 420 and 400 BC, the land of Nephi
 Jarom, son of Enos, writes on the small plates. The Book of Jarom begins.
 Jarom laments that "much should be done among this people".

Between 399 and 361 BC, the land of Nephi
 The Nephites prosper, though the Lamanites are more numerous and come "many times against us, the Nephites, to battle".
 The Nephites multiply and become rich in material goods.
 Prophets of the Lord threaten the Nephites that if they do not keep the commandments, "they should be destroyed".

361 BC, the land of Nephi
 Jarom delivers the plates to his son, Omni.

323 BC, the land of Nephi
 The Book of Omni begins.
 Omni declares there have been "many seasons of peace" and "many seasons of serious war and bloodshed".

317 BC, the land of Nephi
 Omni confers the plates on his son, Amaron.

279 BC, the land of Nephi
 The more wicked part of the Nephites have been destroyed.
 Amaron delivers the plates to his brother, Chemish.

Between 279 and 130 BC, the land of Nephi
 Abinadom, son of Chemish, records that he has seen "much war and contention" between the Nephites and the Lamanites.
 Mosiah is "warned of the Lord that he should flee out of the land of Nephi". Mosiah and "as many as would hearken unto the voice of the Lord" depart the land of Nephi and are led through the wilderness to Zarahemla.

Zarahemla

Between 279 and 130 BC, Zarahemla

 Mosiah and his followers discover the people of Zarahemla.
 The people of Mosiah and the people of Zarahemla unite and appoint Mosiah to be their king.
 Amaleki, son of Abinadom, is "born in the days of Mosiah".
 Mosiah translates a large stone with engravings on it. The stone gives an account of Coriantumr and his people.
 There is a "serious war and much bloodshed" between the Nephites and the Lamanites. 
 End of the small plates of Nephi.
 King Benjamin repulses the attack of the Lamanites and drives them from the land of Zarahemla. King Benjamin has peace the rest of his days.
 King Benjamin dies. His son, Mosiah, reigns in his stead.

About 200 BC, Zarahemla
 An expedition seeks to return to the land of Nephi, "desirous to possess the land of their inheritance". They depart, but contention arises and all but fifty are slain. They return to Zarahemla.
 Zeniff leads a second expedition to the land of Nephi. They treat with the king of the Lamanites, who gives them the lands of Lehi-Nephi and Shilom, displacing their Lamanite inhabitants.

Note: From this point the land where the people of Zeniff dwell is referred to as the land of Lehi-Nephi, but sometimes as the land of Nephi.

About 200 BC, land of Lehi-Nephi
 Zeniff and his followers begin to build buildings and till the ground.

About 188 BC, land of Lehi-Nephi
 War and contention begins between the Lamanites and the people of Zeniff.

About 187 BC, land of Lehi-Nephi
 A "numerous host of Lamanites" attack the land of Shilom. The people flee to the city of Nephi. The people of Zeniff defend themselves and repulse the Lamanites. 279 Nephites are slain.
 The people of Zeniff make weapons of war and set guards around their lands.

About 177 BC, land of Lehi-Nephi
 The people of Zeniff toil and spin and prosper.
 Laman, king of the Lamanites, dies.
 Laman's son, now king of the Lamanites, stirs the Lamanites up to anger against Zeniff and his people.
 Zeniff sends spies to the land of Shemlon to discover the preparations of the Lamanites.
 Zeniff instructs the women, children, the old and infirm to hide in the wilderness. The Lamanites attack the land of Shilom and are driven out after a fierce battle.
 The people of Zeniff return to their lands.

Probably about 160 BC, land of Lehi-Nephi
 Zeniff confers the kingdom on his son, Noah.
 Noah rules in wickedness, taking many wives and concubines. He replaces the priests of his father with his own priests. The people are heavily taxed to support the lavish lifestyle of Noah and his cohorts.
 Noah builds many buildings, including "a spacious palace" and a tall tower near the temple, where he could overlook the lands of Shilom and Shemlon.
 Noah plants vineyards and builds wine presses and becomes a "wine-bibber". He and his priests spend their lives "in riotous living".

About 150 BC, land of Lehi-Nephi
 The Lamanites come upon small numbers of the people of Noah and slay them. Noah sends guards, but in insufficient numbers.
 The Lamanites continue to harass Noah's people and Noah send his armies to drive them back. Victorious, the army returns "rejoicing in their spoil", and boasting of their strength.
 Abinadi begins to prophesy to the people of King Noah, telling them they must repent or they will be delivered into the hands of their enemies. King Noah rejects Abinadi's prophecies and desires to slay him, but is unable to capture Abinadi.

About 148 BC, land of Lehi-Nephi
 Abinadi again begins to prophesy, saying that because the people of Noah have not repented, they will be brought into bondage.
 The people take Abinadi, bind him and bring him before the king. Noah casts Abinadi into prison.
 Noah and his priest have Abinadi brought before them for questioning.
 Abinadi rebukes the king and his priests. Noah orders his priests to take Abinadi away and slay him, but he is protected by divine power and continues to teach them the commandments and redemption through Christ.
 Abinadi finishes his address and Noah again commands his priests to slay him. One of Noah's priests, Alma, believes Abinadi and asks that Abinadi "might depart in peace". Noah casts Alma out and commands that he be slain. Alma flees. Abinadi is cast back into prison.
 After three days, Abinadi is brought before the king and priests again. Noah sentences Abinadi to death (for blasphemy) unless he recalls his words. Abinadi refuses and suffers death by fire.

About 147 BC, the place of Mormon
 Alma preaches in private and gathers a small following. He baptizes them in the waters of Mormon. Alma organizes the "church of Christ" and ordains priests and teachers.
 King Noah discovers "a movement among the people" and sets a watch. When Alma's followers assemble themselves to hear the word of God, Noah sends his army against them.
 Alma and his followers, about 450 souls, take their families and depart into the wilderness. They travel eight days and settle in a land they call Helam.

About 145 BC, land of Lehi-Nephi
 Gideon attempts to slay King Noah.
 The Lamanites attack. King Noah, his priests and other men flee. Those who remain are forced to pay tribute to the Lamanites.
 Those who fled the Lamanites desire to return. King Noah objects and is killed by fire. All but the priests of Noah return. Limhi, son of Noah, becomes tributary monarch.

Between 145 and 122 BC, land of Lehi-Nephi
 The people of Alma prosper in the land of Helam. Alma serves as high priest.
 The fugitive priests of King Noah kidnap several Lamanite women.
 The Lamanites, mistakenly blaming the people of Limhi, attack but withdraw when they see their error.
 The people of Limhi, having failed three times to overcome the Lamanites by force, become resigned to their tributary status.
 The priests of King Noah, with the Lamanite women, settle in a land they name after their leader, Amulon.
 Limhi sends a group to search for the land of Zarahemla. They discover instead the land formerly occupied by the Jaredites. They bring back a record on twenty-four plates but they are unable to read it.

Between 130 and 121 BC, Zarahemla
 The Book of Mosiah begins.
 124 BC: Benjamin addresses his people, exhorting them to serve one another and to take upon themselves the name of Christ.
 Benjamin records the names of his people who have "entered into a covenant with God to keep his commandments".
 Benjamin consecrates his son, Mosiah, to be king.
 121 BC: Benjamin dies.
 Mosiah sends sixteen men, led by Ammon, to the land of Lehi-Nephi to discover the fate of Zeniff and his followers.

About 121 BC, land of Lehi-Nephi
 Ammon discovers the people of Limhi and assists them in escaping from the Lamanites. The people of Limhi join Mosiah's people in Zarahemla.
 An army of Lamanites pursue the people of Limhi but become lost after two days. The Lamanite army discovers the land of Amulon. The people of Amulon join the Lamanites. Together the Lamanites and Amulonites discover the people of Alma and take possession of the land of Helam.
 Laman, king of the Lamanites, appoints Amulon and his brethren to instruct his people. The Lamanites "increase in riches" and become "a cunning and wise people, as to the wisdom of the world".
 Amulon begins to exercise authority over the people of Alma. Alma's people are persecuted and afflicted.

About 120 BC, land of Lehi-Nephi
 The people of Alma miraculously escape and join the Nephites in Zarahemla.

About 120 BC, Zarahemla
 Mosiah addresses his people and rehearses the story of the people of Zeniff and their eventual deliverance. All the people of Zarahemla are called Nephites. Alma organizes the church in Zarahemla.

Between 120 and 92 BC, Zarahemla
 Many Nephites, especially the younger generation, refuse to join the church. 
 Mosiah forbids persecution of the church by unbelievers.
 Alma, son of Alma, and the four sons of Mosiah are numbered among the unbelievers. Alma the Younger becomes "a great hinderment to the prosperity of the church of God", secretly seeking, with the sons of Mosiah, to destroy the church.
 An angel appears to Alma the Younger and the sons of Mosiah, telling them to "seek to destroy the church no more". They fall to the earth. Alma is insensible for two days but awakens to tell of his conversion. Alma the Younger and the sons of Mosiah thenceforward seek to build up the church.

About 92 BC, Zarahemla
 The sons of Mosiah refuse to succeed their father as king. They leave Zarahemla to carry the message of the gospel to the Lamanites.
 Mosiah translates the twenty-four plates discovered by the people of Limhi. They contain the record of the Jaredites.
 Mosiah gives all the records, including the brass plates and the plates of Limhi, and "the interpreters" to Alma.
 Mosiah, having no willing heir and fearing the difficulties that would arise from a contested succession or the rule of an unjust king, proposes the establishment of the rule of law, with judges to govern the people. Judges are to be appointed by the people and higher judges may overrule lower judges. The chief judge may be overruled by a council of lesser judges. Mosiah will continue to serve as king until his death.
 Alma the Younger is appointed as the first chief judge. He is also appointed high priest by his father.

91 BC, Zarahemla
 Alma the Elder dies.
 King Mosiah dies.
 Reign of the judges commences.

The reign of the judges

91 BC, Zarahemla
 The Book of Alma begins.
 Nehor teaches priestcraft and slays Gideon. He is executed, but his followers persecute those in the church.

About 90 BC, Zarahemla
 Contentions arise, but Alma regulates the church. The people prosper, but more especially those who belong to the church.

About 90 BC, among the Lamanites
 The sons of Mosiah: Ammon, Aaron, Omner and Himni, preach among the Lamanites
 Ammon goes to the land of Ishmael and is taken captive. He is brought before the king, Lamoni. Ammon becomes Lamoni's servant and miraculously preserves the king's flocks.
 Ammon is called before the king. Lamoni is converted and Ammon establishes a church in Ishmael.
 Aaron is rejected by the people of Jerusalem. He and his companions are imprisoned in the land of Middoni.
 Ammon and Lamoni journey to Middoni to free the prisoners. They meet Lamoni's father, king of all the Lamanites. Believing Ammon has deceived his son, Lamoni's father tries to slay Ammon. Ammon withstands the old king and persuades him to allow Lamoni to rule unhindered. Ammon and Lamoni proceed to Middoni and free the prisoners.
 Aaron visits Lamoni's father, who is troubled by the words of Ammon regarding repentance and salvation. Aaron teaches and converts the king and all his household.

Between 90 and 81 BC, among the Lamanites
 Religious freedom is granted to all Lamanites. The Lamanites in the lands of Ishmael and Middoni, the city of Nephi, and several other cities are converted. The Amalekites and Amulonites, Nephite dissenters living among the Lamanites, are not converted.
 The converted Lamanites call themselves the Anti-Nephi-Lehies. They vow never to take up arms again.
 Lamoni's father confers the kingdom on his son, Anti-Nephi-Lehi. Lamoni's father dies.
 The unconverted Lamanites prepare to make war against the Anti-Nephi-Lehies. They reiterate their refusal to take up arms, even to defend themselves.
 The Lamanites attack the Anti-Nephi-Lehies, but desist when the Anti-Nephi-Lehies refuse to defend themselves. Many of the attackers are converted.

87 BC, Zarahemla
 Amlici, a follower of Nehor, endeavors to establish himself as king.
 The people vote and Amlici is unsuccessful. Nevertheless, his followers set him apart as their king.
 The Amlicites wage war on the Nephites. The Amlicites are defeated but are then joined by the Lamanites and attack again. Alma slays Amlici and The Lamanites are driven out.
 The Lamanites attack once more but are repulsed again.

Between 86 and 84 BC, Zarahemla
 86 BC: The Nephites begin to "establish the church more fully".
 85 BC 3,500 Nephites join the church.
 84 BC The people of the church begin to "wax proud, because of their exceeding riches". Contentions arise.

Between 83 and 81 BC, Zarahemla and environs
 83 BC: Alma selects Nephihah to replace him as chief judge, but retains the office of high priest in order to combat the pride and dissension in the church.
 Alma preaches in Zarahemla, Gideon and Melek.
 82 BC: Alma preaches in Ammonihah but is rejected. An angel commands him to return. He is joined by Amulek and they preach again to the people of Ammonihah.
 Zeezrom contends with Alma but is silenced, fearing he has sinned.
 Alma and Amulek are imprisoned. The people of Ammonihah martyr the believers among them and burn the scriptures.
 81 BC: Alma and Amulek are miraculously delivered from prison and their persecutors are slain.
 Alma and Amulek preach in Sidom. Alma heals Zeezrom.
 Alma and Amulek return to Zarahemla.
 An army of Lamanites, following the abortive attack on the Anti-Nephi-Lehies, attack and destroy the city of Ammonihah. Zoram leads the Nephite army to victory over the Lamanites.

Between 81 and 77 BC, among the Lamanites
 Many more Lamanites are converted and join the Anti-Nephi-Lehies.
 The Amalekites seek to convince the Lamanites to avenge their losses by attacking the Anti-Nephi-Lehies again.
 Ammon is directed by the Lord to lead the Anti-Nephi-Lehies to the land of Zarahemla. As they are journeying, the sons of Mosiah meet Alma and are re-united.
 The Anti-Nephi-Lehies are received by the Nephites and given the land of Jershon. They are now called the people of Ammon, or Ammonites.

Between 76 and 69 BC, Zarahemla
 76 BC: The Lamanites come against the Nephites. There is a "tremendous battle" with great losses on both sides. The Lamanites are defeated and there is peace for two years.
 74 BC: Korihor, an antichrist, preaches false doctrine and is brought before Alma. Korihor demands a sign from God and is struck dumb. Korihor recants, in writing, and is later trampled to death by the Zoramites, an apostate group.
 Alma leads a mission to the Zoramites. They are rejected by the more wealthy people, but enjoy success among the poorer classes.
 The Zoramites cast out the converts who join with the Ammonites in Jershon. The Zoramites begin to mingle with the Lamanites and prepare to go to war against the Nephites.
 The Ammonites remove to the land of Melek so that the armies of the Nephites can occupy the land of Jershon.
 Alma sorrows for the iniquity of his people and the bloodshed and wars. He counsels his sons, Helaman, Shiblon and Corianton.
 The Zoramites become Lamanites. The army of the Lamanites, led by Zerahemnah, come to battle against the Nephites. Moroni, chief captain of the Nephites, asks Alma to inquire of the Lord how to direct his armies. Moroni and Lehi lead the Nephites to victory.
 73 BC: Alma gives the records to his son, Helaman. Alma is "taken up by the Spirit,...even as Moses".
 Amalickiah, desiring to be king, persuades many Nephites to dissent. He and his followers seek to obtain power and destroy the church and the government.
 Moroni, angered by Amalickiah's actions, rends his coat and writes upon it--"In memory of our God, our religion, our freedom, and our peace, our wives and our children". He fastens the writing to a pole and calls it the "title of liberty".
 Moroni goes forth with the title of liberty and raises an army to defeat the Amalickiahites. Outnumbered, the Amalickiahites seek to flee and join with the Lamanites, but Moroni heads them off, although Amalickiah and a few followers escape. The dissenters are compelled to swear allegiance or be put to death.
 72 BC: Amalickiah uses treachery, murder and intrigue to become king of the Lamanites. He incites the Lamanites to war with the Nephites.
 Moroni prepares for war by fortifying the Nephite cities.
 The Lamanites come to war but are unable to overcome Moroni's defenses. When their chief captains are slain, the Lamanites withdraw.
 Helaman, Shiblon, Corianton and Ammon preach among the people.
 Moroni erects a fortified line of cities between the Nephites and the Lamanites.
 72 to 69 BC: The Nephites prosper: "There never was a happier time among the people of Nephi"

Between 68 and 67 BC, Zarahemla
 The people of Morianton contend with the people of Lehi over possession of land. The people of Morianton attempt to flee to the land northward. An army of Nephites, led by Teancum, overtakes them and defeats them in battle.
 Nephihah dies. Pahoran, son of Nephihah is appointed chief judge.
 The "king-men" try to alter the law to allow the establishment of a king over the Nephites. They fail to persuade a majority.
 Amalickiah again leads the Lamanites to war against the Nephites. The king-men refuse to assist in defending the Nephites. Moroni sends an army to compel the dissenters to defend their country or be put to death. Four thousand king-men are killed and the rebellion is put down.
 The Nephites armies, reduced by the rebellion, are unable to defend their cities. The Lamanites take possession of many cities.
 Teancum steals into the Lamanite camp and slays Amalickiah.

Between 66 and 63 BC, Zarahemla
 Ammoron, brother of Amalickiah, is appointed king of the Lamanites. Ammoron returns to the land of the Lamanites, leaving Jacob in charge of the Lamanite armies in Zarahemla.
 Moroni, Teancum and Lehi retake the city of Mulek. Jacob is slain. Many Lamanites are taken prisoner.
 The Lamanites take possession of a number of cities near the west sea.
 The people of Ammon, seeing the precarious situation of the Nephites, considering taking up arms again. Helaman persuades them to uphold their oath to renounce arms, but raises an army of two thousand of their sons who had not taken the oath.
 Ammoron negotiates with Moroni for the exchange of prisoners, but they are unable to come to terms. The Nephite prisoners escape. The city of Gid is retaken.
 Helaman and Antipus win a great victory over the Lamanite army, taking many prisoners of war. They send the prisoners under guard to Zarahemla. The Lamanite armies attack the Nephites guarding the prisoners and free the prisoners. Helaman, Gid and Teancum defeat the Lamanites, defending the city of Cumeni and retaking the city of Manti.

Between 62 and 60 BC, Zarahemla
 Moroni writes to Pahoran, complaining of lack of support for his armies from the Nephite government.
 Pahoran replies that the king-men have rebelled and he has been compelled to flee to the land of Gideon. The king-men hold the city of Zarahemla and are in league with the Lamanites. Pahoran requests Moroni's aid in defeating the dissenters.
 Moroni marches to Zarahemla, raising assistance en route. Moroni and Pahoran defeat the king-men in Zarahemla and slay Pachus, their leader. The dissenters are once again compelled to defend their country or be put to death.
 Moroni and Pahoran retake the city of Nephihah. Many Lamanite prisoners join the people of Ammon. Moroni, Lehi and Teancum pursue the Lamanite armies. Teancum steals into the Lamanite camp and slays Ammoron, but is slain in turn. The Nephite armies, under Moroni and Teancum, defeat the Lamanites and drive them from the land of Zarahemla.

Between 60 and 53 BC, Zarahemla
 Moroni fortifies the lands exposed to the Lamanites and yields command of the armies to his son, Moronihah.
 Helaman and his brethren go forth to regulate the church.
 57 BC: Helaman dies. Shiblon, son of Alma, takes charge of the records.
 56 BC: Moroni dies.
 55-54 BC: Hagoth builds ships and several expeditions sail off to the north.
 53 BC: Shiblon dies. Helaman, son of Helaman takes charge of the records. The Lamanites attack but are driven back by the army of Moronihah.
 End of the Book of Alma.

Between 52 and 39 BC, Zarahemla
 The Book of Helaman begins.
 52 BC: Pahoran dies. Pahoran's sons, Pahoran, Paanchi and Pacumeni, contend for the judgement-seat. Pahoran is appointed chief judge by the voice of the people. Paanchi incites rebellion and is condemned to death. Kishkumen founds a secret combination and murders Pahoran on the judgement-seat. Pacumeni is appointed chief judge.
 51 BC: A Lamanite army, led by Coriantumr, takes possession of the city of Zarahemla and slays Pacumeni. Moronihah retakes Zarahemla and Coriantumr is slain.
 50 BC: Helaman, son of Helaman, is appointed chief judge.
 Gadianton becomes the leader of Kishkumen's band. Kishkumen attempts to murder Helaman but is slain by Helaman's servant. Gadianton's band flees into the wilderness.
 46 BC: There is "much contention and many dissensions". Many Nephites leave Zarahemla and settle in the land northward.
 45 BC: Helaman rules "with justice and equity" and the contentions lessen. Helaman's sons, Nephi and Lehi, are mentioned.
 43 BC: Peace is established except for the secret combinations of Gadianton.
 41 BC: Pride begins to enter the church.
 39 BC: Helaman dies. Nephi, son of Helaman, becomes chief judge.

Between 38 and 30 BC, Zarahemla
 38 BC: There are "many dissensions in the church, and...contention among the people". The Nephite dissenters go over to the Lamanites.
 35-33 BC: The Lamanites come against the Nephites. They take possession of all "the land southward".
 32-31 BC: Moronihah succeeds in regaining half the Nephite lands.
 30 BC: The Nephites "abandon their desire to obtain the remainder of their lands".
 Nephi gives up the judgement-seat to Cezoram.
 Nephi and Lehi go forth to preach repentance to the Nephites, then to the Lamanites in the land of Zarahemla, and then to the land of Nephi.
 Many Lamanites are converted. The Lamanites yield up the lands of the Nephites.

Between 29 and 24 BC, the lands of Mulek and Lehi
 29 BC: The Lamanites become more righteous than the Nephites.
 The Nephites and Lamanites enjoy peace and free trade among their peoples.
 The land north is called Mulek and the land south is called Lehi.
 26 BC: Cezoram is murdered on the judgement-seat by Gadianton's band.
 25 BC: The people become more wicked. Gadianton's robbers prosper, especially among the Nephites.
 24 BC: The Lamanites drive the Gadianton robbers from their lands. The Nephites build up and support the robbers and their secret combinations. The Gadianton robbers obtain control of the Nephite government.

Between 23 and 14 BC, Zarahemla
 Nephi returns to Zarahemla.
 Nephi preaches that the people must repent or perish. He miraculously announces the murder of Seezoram, the chief judge. He and others are imprisoned until he miraculously names the murderer.
 19 BC: There are "wars throughout all the land among the people of Nephi". Nephi prays for famine, rather than war.
 18-17 BC: The destruction continues, despite increasing difficulties from famine.
 16 BC: The people, about to perish from famine, cease fighting. Nephi prays for rain and the Lord grants Nephi's petition.
 The Nephites recover from the famine and enjoy peace for a short time.

Between 13 and 7 BC, throughout the land
 Gadianton's band increases in numbers. They "make great havoc, yea, even great destruction among the people of Nephi, and also among the people of the Lamanites". The robbers defy the armies of the Nephites and the Lamanites. The people grow more wicked.

Between 6 and 5 BC, Zarahemla
 Samuel, a Lamanite prophet, prophesies the destruction of the Nephites if they do not repent. He predicts signs of Christ's birth and death.
 Nephi baptizes those who believe Samuel's message.
 Samuel cannot be harmed by arrows or stones, nor can he be taken. Samuel departs from Zarahemla.

Between 2 and 1 BC, Zarahemla
 The signs indicating Christ's birth, foretold by Samuel and other prophets, begin to be fulfilled. The unbelievers deny the validity of the signs.

1 BC, Zarahemla
 Third Nephi begins.
 Lachoneus is chief judge.
 Nephi, son of Helaman, departs. Nephi, son of Nephi, is given charge of the records.
 There is a great division over the signs of Christ's birth. A date is given where, unless the signs are all fulfilled, the believers will be put to death.

From the birth of Christ to His death

AD 1, Zarahemla
 The sign of Christ's birth, a day and a night and a day with no darkness, is given on the eve of the day specified for the destruction of the believers. A new star appears.
 AD 9: The Nephites begin to set their calendars according to when the sign was given.
 Many are converted, but the Gadianton robbers still thrive.

Between AD 3 and 15, throughout the land
 Some forget (or dismiss) the signs that were given. Wickedness increases among the Nephites and the Lamanites. Those who remain true are all called Nephites.
 The Gadianton robbers increase in strength and threaten to destroy the Nephites. Wars and contentions exist throughout the land.

Between AD 15 and 21, Zarahemla
 AD 15: Giddianhi, leader of the Gadianton robbers, sends an epistle to Lachoneus, the chief judge, demanding the surrender of the Nephites.
 AD 17: The Nephites gather in the lands of Zarahemla and Bountiful. They bring sufficient supplies to withstand seven years of siege.
 AD 18: The Gadianton robbers take possession of the abandoned Nephite lands, but cannot subsist without plundering the Nephites. They attack the Nephites and are driven back. Giddianhi is slain.
 AD 21: Zemnarihah, the new leader of the robbers, lays siege to the Nephite fortifications, but the siege is more damaging to the robbers than to the Nephites. Zemnarihah determines to withdraw. Gidgiddoni, leader of the Nephite armies, knowing their weakness, attacks the robbers and defeats them. Zemnarihah is hanged.

Between AD 21 and 33, throughout the land
 The Nephites hunt out the remnants of the robber band. The robbers are destroyed.
 AD 26: The Nephites return to their former lands, and the Nephites prosper for a time.
 AD 29: Contentions over power and wealth arise. The people become wicked. Secret combinations arise once more, seeking to murder the prophets and to overthrow the government.
 AD 30: Lachoneus, son of Lachoneus, becomes chief judge. Lachoneus II is murdered and the government is overthrown. The people divide into tribes, "every man according to his kindred and friends". The secret combinations gather to a tribe led by a man named Jacob, and flee into the land northward.
 AD 31-33: Nephi ministers to the people and performs miracles, but few are converted.

The coming of Christ

At the commencement of AD 34, throughout the land
 AD 34, the fourth day of the first month: Great and terrible destruction occurs -- "The face of the whole earth became deformed". Many cities are destroyed with their inhabitants. The destruction lasts "for about the space of three hours".
 Unremitting darkness covers the land for three days. "There was not any light seen, neither fire, nor glimmer, neither the sun, nor the moon, nor the stars".
 As the people howl and mourn their great losses, a voice from heaven proclaims the destruction of numerous people and cities, because of their wickedness. The voice continues: "I am Jesus Christ, the Son of God". He declares the fulfillment of the law of Moses and invites all men to repent and come unto Him.
 The darkness disperses and the earthquakes and groanings from the earth cease. The mourning of the survivors is "turned into joy, and their lamentations into the praise and thanksgiving unto the Lord Jesus Christ". 
 Those who were spared were "the more righteous part of the people". They recognize their survival as the fulfillment of prophecy.

At the ending of AD 34, near Bountiful
 "In the ending of the thirty and fourth year" a great multitude gathers near the temple in the land of Bountiful.
 The voice of God invites the multitude: "Behold, my Beloved Son, in whom I am well pleased".
 Jesus descends out of heaven. He invites the multitude to examine the wounds in His hands and feet and side. He instructs them in the correct manner of baptism. He chooses twelve men, including Nephi, to minister to the people.
 Jesus preaches to the multitude and delivers a discourse similar to the Sermon on the Mount. He announces the fulfillment of the law of Moses.
 He tells the Nephites that they are the "other sheep" that he spoke of to the Jews. He tells them there are yet other sheep that he will visit.
 He directs the people to pray and speaks to them in words that cannot be written. Angels minister to the people.
 Christ institutes the sacrament and commands them to pray. He ascends into heaven.
 The people disperse to their homes and word goes out that Christ will appear again tomorrow. Those further away "labor exceedingly all that night" to be at the place where Christ will appear.
 The next day, the twelve disciples divide the multitude into twelve groups and rehearse to them the words of Christ. They invite them to pray for the Holy Ghost and all are baptized by the twelve disciples. They are encircled with fire and angels minister to them. 
 Christ appears in their midst and ministers unto them. He miraculously provides bread and wine and administers the sacrament.
 Christ speaks of the last days and of the gathering of Israel. He recites the prophecies of Isaiah and Malachi.
 In all, Christ teaches the people for three days. He ministers to the children and heals the sick.

Between AD 34 and 35
 The people are taught and baptized by the twelve disciples. They have "all things common among them".
 Jesus appears again to the twelve in answer to their prayer concerning the name of the church. Christ tells them the church must be called in His name. Three disciples are given power to remain on the earth until Christ's second coming.
 The twelve "go forth among all the people of Nephi" and preach. The people are converted and "united unto the church of Christ".
 End of Third Nephi. Fourth Nephi begins.

Between AD 36 and 321
 AD 36: "The people [are] all converted unto the Lord".
 AD 36-60: There is continual peace. The disciples of Jesus perform many "great and marvelous works".
 Many cities, including Zarahemla, are rebuilt.
 AD 100: All the disciples, save "the three who should tarry", have died and others are chosen in their stead. Amos, son of Nephi, takes charge of the records.
 "Surely there could not be a happier people among all the people who had been created by the hand of God". There are no robbers, or Lamanites, "nor any manner of -ites".
 AD 110: All the first generation from Christ have died.
 AD 194: Amos dies. Amos, son of Amos, keeps the records.
 A small group of people revolt from the church and call themselves Lamanites.
 AD 200: All but a few of the second generation have died.
 AD 201: Some begin to be lifted up in pride in "costly apparel...and of the fine things of the world". The people no longer have their goods and substance in common, and they begin to be divided in classes.
 AD 211: There are many churches in the land, some of which deny Christ and persecute believers.
 AD 231: There is a great division. The believers are called Nephites and the unbelievers are called Lamanites.
 AD 245: The wicked are "exceedingly more numerous" than the people of God.
 AD 261: The secret combinations and oaths of Gadianton reappear.
 AD 301: The Nephites have become as wicked as the Lamanites.
 AD 306: Amos dies. His brother Ammaron takes charge of the records.
 AD 311 (about): Mormon is born.
 AD 321: Ammaron hides the records.

Mormon and Moroni

Between AD 321 and 328 (Mormon's Youth)
 AD 321 (about): Ammaron visits Mormon and instructs him on the location of the sacred engravings.
 AD 322: Mormon is carried into the land southward to the land of Zarahemla by his father.
 AD 326: Mormon is visited by the Lord at the age of fifteen, "and taste[s] and [knows] of the goodness of Jesus".
 AD 327-28: Mormon becomes head of the Nephite armies and leads them in battle against the Lamanites.

Between AD 328 and 350
 AD 331: Mormon and his army of 42,000 defeats the Lamanite king, Aaron, and his army of 44,000.
 AD 335 (about): Mormon goes to the hill called Shim in the land Antum, takes the plates of Nephi, and begins his abridgment of the records.
 AD 345: Nephites retreat to the land of Jashon, but are driven forth again northward to the land of Shem.
 AD 346: A Nephite army of 30,000 beats a Lamanite army of 50,000.
 AD 350: The Nephites make a treaty with the Lamanites and the Gadianton Robbers, giving the Nephites the land northward up "to the narrow passage which led into the land southward", and giving the Lamanites the land southward.

Between AD 350 and 360
No battles fought between the Nephites and the Lamanites

Between AD 360 and 385
 AD 360: Lamanites again come to battle the Nephites.
 AD 362: Nephites beat the Lamanites in battle and begin to boast in their own strength and "swear before the heavens that they would avenge themselves of the blood of their brethren who had been slain by their enemies". Mormon "utterly refuse[s]...to be a commander and a leader" to the Nephites.
 AD 363: Nephite armies attack the Lamanites and are beaten back. Lamanites take the city of Desolation.
 AD 364-66: Lamanites attack the city of Teancum, but are driven back. Nephites retake the city of Desolation.
 AD 367: Mormon describes "the horrible scene of the blood and carnage which was among the people, both of the Nephites and of the Lamanites". Lamanites take the city of Desolation back driving the Nephites before them, next attacking the city of Teancum and taking many women and children prisoners to offer up as sacrifices to their idol gods. Nephites drive the Lamanites out of their land in anger over Lamanite sacrifices.
AD 375: After eight years of no conflict between the two sides, the Lamanites attack. Meanwhile, the Nephites, from this point forth, gain no power over their enemies, resulting in a nationwide retreat.
Sometime between AD 375 and 380: Mormon resumes command of the Nephite armies.
Between AD 380 and 385: Mormon, with the permission of the Lamanites' king, gathers his people to Cumorah to fight the Lamanites.
AD 385: The Nephites finish gathering their people. Around this time is when Mormon abridges the Large Plates of Nephi, and compiles the record into its almost finished product (See  and ).
They then go to battle, resulting in the annihilation of the Nephite nation, with 230,000 Nephite casualties, or 10,000 each led by 23 captains. Only 24 survive, including Mormon and his son Moroni. Mormon bids farewell to the once great nation.

Between AD 385 and 421
Between AD 385 and 400: Of the remaining survivors of the final battle, all are hunted down and slain, except for Moroni.
Between AD 401 and 421: Moroni finishes his father's work; abridges the book of Ether, the record of the Jaredites; and finishes with his own book, including the church ordinances and some of his father's teachings and writings.
About AD 421: Moroni finishes the work his father and ancestors started, leaving a promise to its readers, and buries it in the earth.

See also

Mosiah priority

References

Further reading
 

Chronology
Chronology
Book of Mormon